Ben Tudhope (born 13 December 1999) is an Australian Paralympian who has competed in para-snowboard cross at three Winter Paralympics 2014 to 2022. His selection at the age of 14 at the 2014 Winter Paralympics meant that he became Australia's youngest Winter Paralympian, replacing Michael Milton. He was the youngest competitor at the 2014 Winter Paralympic Games from any country. He also competed at the 2018 Winter Paralympics. At the 2022 Winter Paralympics, he won the bronze medal in the Men's Snowboard Cross SB-LL2.

Personal
Ben Tudhope was born with cerebral palsy due to a lack of oxygen to the brain during his birth and damage caused to the white matter in his brain, which caused hemiplegia on the left side of his body and damage connecting nerve tissue vital for movement. He lives in Manly, a suburb of Sydney, and attended the Sydney Church of England Grammar School. He has undertaken a Bachelor of Management – Sport Business at the University of Technology Sydney.

Career

Tudhope's older sister Annabel introduced him to snowboarding in 2009. Annabel has competed on the World Snowboard Tour, and his other sister Phoebe has competed for Australia in mogul skiing. His Winter Paralympics path began in 2011 when Peter Baff, the head coach of Perisher's Winter Sports Club alerted Peter Higgins, Australia's Paralympic snowboard team head coach, of his ability even though he was not tall.

Ben competed in the 2013 European Cup to qualify for the 2014 Winter Paralympics. Due to his age, his mother Melissa has accompanied him to overseas competitions. He trains at Perisher Ski Resort, and undertakes dryland training at Monster Skatepark in the Sydney suburb of Homebush. In 2013, he was an Amelia McGuiness Australian Snowsports Development Foundation scholarship holder.

Tudhope's selection for the 2014 Winter Paralympics in Sochi at the age of 14 meant that he became Australia's youngest Winter Paralympian, replacing Mitchell Gourley. He was the youngest competitor at the 2014 Winter Paralympic Games from any country. He finished 10th out of 33 competitors in the Men's Para-snowboard Cross, and was chosen to carry the Australian flag at the closing ceremony.

In 2017, Tudhope became part of the Sport Australia Hall of Fame Scholarship and Mentoring Program which included him being mentored by former Australian rugby union captain Nick Farr-Jones.

At the 2018 Winter Paralympics, Tudhope finished seventh in the banked slalom SB-LL2 and tenth in the snowboard cross SB-LL2.

At the 2019 World Para Snowboard Championships, Pyha, Finland, Tudhope won the silver medal in Men's Snowboard Cross LL2 and finished fourth in the Men's Banked Slalom LL2.

Tudhope won the silver medal in the men's snowboard cross SB-LL2 and bronze medal in the men's dual banked slalom SB-LL2 event at the 2021 World Para Snow Sports Championships held in Lillehammer, Norway.

At the 2022 Winter Paralympics in Beijing, Tudhope won the bronze medal in the men's snowboard cross SB-LL2 and finished ninth in the men's snowboard banked slalom SB-LL2 event.

Tudehope won the gold medal in the Men's Snowboard Cross SB-LL2 at the 2023 World Para Snowboard Championships held at La Molina.

Recognition
2014 - Flag bearer at the Closing Ceremony at the 2014 Winter Paralympics.
2019 – Sport NSW Young Athlete of the Year with a Disability
2020 – Crystal Globe as the overall SB-LL2 Snowboard Cross 2019–20 season Champion and the Crystal Globe as the most successful Para Snowboard athlete across all disciplines
2020 – Snow Australia Paralympic Athlete of the Year 
2021 – Snow Australia Paralympic Athlete of the Year
2022 – Crystal Globe as the overall SB-LL2 Snowboard Cross 2021–22 season Champion and the Crystal Globe as the most successful Para Snowboard athlete across all disciplines.
2022 – Joint Team Captain with Melissa Perrine of Australian Team at 2022 Winter Paralympics
2022 - Flag bearer at Closing Ceremony at 2022 Winter Paralympics
2022 – Snow Australia Paralympic Athlete of the Year
2022 - Paralympics Male Athlete of the Year 
2022 - Paralympics Australia Athlete of the Year 
2022 - New South Wales Institute of Sport Male Athlete of the Year 
2022 - Australian Institute of Sport Male Para-athlete of The Year

References

External links
 
 International Paralympic Committee Profile
 World Para Snowboard Results
 

1999 births
Living people
Australian male snowboarders
Cerebral Palsy category Paralympic competitors
People educated at Sydney Church of England Grammar School
People from Manly, New South Wales
Paralympic snowboarders of Australia
Snowboarders at the 2014 Winter Paralympics
Snowboarders at the 2018 Winter Paralympics
Snowboarders at the 2022 Winter Paralympics
Medalists at the 2022 Winter Paralympics
Paralympic medalists in snowboarding
Paralympic bronze medalists for Australia
X Games athletes
20th-century Australian people
21st-century Australian people